Boulard is a surname. Notable people with the surname include:

Garry Boulard (born 1953), American reporter and author
Hubert Boulard (1971–2020), French comics writer and colorist
Jean-Claude Boulard (1943–2018), French politician
Martin Silvestre Boulard (1748–1809), French printer-bookseller